The 1962 United States Senate election in Arkansas took place on November 6, 1962. Incumbent Senator J. William Fulbright won a fourth term in office, defeating primary challenger Winston G. Chandler and Republican Party nominee Kenneth G. Jones without much threat.

Democratic primary

Candidates
J. William Fulbright, incumbent Senator since 1945
Winston G. Chandler

Results

General election

Results

See also
1962 United States Senate elections

References 

1962
Arkansas
United States Senate